Willie Clarke is an American musician and songwriter known for songs including "Clean Up Woman", "Rockin' Chair" and "Willing and Able".

Clarke and a college friend, Johnny Pearsall, started the record label Deep City, based out of Johnny's Records in Liberty City, Florida. It was the first African American owned independent record label in Florida.

Clarke was featured on the Miami 2015 episode of the CNN television show Anthony Bourdain: Parts Unknown.

Deep City Records
Deep City Records was a record label run out of a music store in the Liberty City section of Miami. Clarke was one of the founders.

See also
TK Records

References

External links

African-American songwriters
American male songwriters
Living people
American businesspeople
Soul musicians
Grammy Award winners
Year of birth missing (living people)
21st-century African-American people